The Stoltz House, at 405 S.W. First St. in Park City, Montana, was built in 1906.  It was listed on the National Register of Historic Places in 1991.

It is Classical Revival in style, and is believed to be the oldest house in Park City from its settlement period.

In 1990, trees on the property included some of the oldest fruit trees in the Yellowstone Valley.

References

National Register of Historic Places in Stillwater County, Montana
Neoclassical architecture in Montana
Houses completed in 1906
1906 establishments in Montana
Houses in Stillwater County, Montana
Houses on the National Register of Historic Places in Montana